Golzar (also Romanized as Golzār and Kolzār) is a village in Dowreh Rural District, Chegeni District, Dowreh County, Lorestan Province, Iran. At the 2006 census, its population was 136, in 36 families.

References 

Towns and villages in Dowreh County